U.E. is a 2006 Russian thriller/detective TV-miniseries. Total episodes released - 8.

U.E. means conventional unit  in English or условная единица  in Russian. It is a euphemism for US Dollar (USD) (1 U.E. = 1 USD) and was used in the Soviet era and 1990s in Russia when Russia's economy, currency etc. were in turmoil and Russian shopkeepers etc. did not want to overtly be seen pricing products in USD

Filming locations: Los Angeles, California, New York City, New York, USA; Moscow, Russia.

Plot summary 
FSB colonel Chernov was investigating a money laundering crimes for a long time. Sent to a retirement pension, his sharpened sense of justice keep him from assured rest when Chernov suddenly founds that on a recently deceased businessman's account a millions of dollars are settling. Chernov decides to return them to Russia. But many more people dream to possess on that money...

Cast 
 Aleksandr Atanesyan as Kharunov
 Dorie Gray as Samantha
 Irina Grineva as Solov'eva
 Andrey Krasko as Colonel Chernov
 Vladimir Menshov as General Palmetov
 Dyana Ortelli as Selma
 Laura Rohrman as Kimberly Sparks
 Jakob Sarkissian as Vania (Polina's son)
 Marcus Tingle as Glen
 Evgeniya Trofimova as Polina
 Andrei Zibrov as Bannikov

External links 
 

NTV (Russia) original programming
Russian crime television series
2006 Russian television series debuts
2006 Russian television series endings
2000s Russian television series
Russian television miniseries
Films directed by Aleksandr Atanesyan